is a passenger railway station in the town of Naganohara, Gunma, Japan, operated by East Japan Railway Company (JR East).

Lines
Kawarayu-Onsen Station is served by the Agatsuma Line, and is located 42.0 kilometers from the starting point of the line at Shibukawa Station.

Station layout
The station consists of a single island platform connected to the station building by a footbridge. It is staffed.

Platforms

History
The station opened on 20 April 1946, initially named . With the privatization of Japanese National Railways (JNR) on 1 April 1987, the station came under the control of JR East. It was renamed Kawarayu-Onsen on 1 December 1991.

Passenger statistics
In fiscal 2019, the station was used by an average of 18 passengers daily (boarding passengers only).

Surrounding area
Kawarayu Post Office
Kawarayu Onsen

See also
 List of railway stations in Japan

References

External links

  

Railway stations in Gunma Prefecture
Agatsuma Line
Stations of East Japan Railway Company
Railway stations in Japan opened in 1946
Naganohara, Gunma